ABA championship may refer to:
List of ABA champions, list of championships from defunct American professional basketball league in the 1960s and 1970s
ABA championship, league title from American Basketball Association (2000–present), an American semi-professional basketball league
ABA Championships, boxing tournament

See also
ABA Club Championship, Asian basketball tournament